Gilbert Archibald Currie (September 19, 1882 – June 5, 1960) was a politician from the U.S. state of Michigan.

Currie was born in Midland Township, Michigan, attended the district school, Midland High School, and graduated from the law department of the University of Michigan at Ann Arbor in 1905. He was admitted to the Michigan bar in 1905 and commenced practice in Midland. He was a member of the Michigan House of Representatives, 1909–1915, serving as Speaker of the House during the 47th Legislature.

Currie was an unsuccessful candidate for the Republican nomination in 1914 to the 64th Congress. In 1916, he was elected from Michigan's 10th congressional district to the 65th Congress and was reelected in 1918 to the 66th, serving from March 4, 1917, to March 3, 1921. He was unsuccessful candidate for renomination in 1920.

After leaving Congress, Currie resumed the practice of law and also engaged in the banking business until his death in Midland at the age of 77. He was interred in Midland Cemetery.

References 

 The Political Graveyard

External links 
 

1882 births
1960 deaths
Speakers of the Michigan House of Representatives
Burials in Michigan
People from Midland, Michigan
University of Michigan Law School alumni
Republican Party members of the United States House of Representatives from Michigan
20th-century American politicians